Bruce Wayne is the secret identity of the DC Comics character Batman.

Bruce Wayne may also refer to:

Fictional characters
 Bruce Wayne (1989 film series character), a character portrayed by Michael Keaton, Val Kilmer, and George Clooney from the 1989 film series
 Bruce Wayne (Dark Knight trilogy), a character portrayed by Christian Bale from The Dark Knight Trilogy
 Bruce Wayne (Gotham), the fictional character from the TV series Gotham
 Bruce Wayne Junior, a DC Comics alternate universe version of Robin
 Bruce Wayne (DC Extended Universe), a character portrayed by Ben Affleck from the DC Extended Universe

Other uses
 Bruce Wayne (TV series), a cancelled 1999 series about DC Comics' young Bruce Wayne
 "Bruce Wayne" (Titans episode), a 2019 episode of the DC Comics TV series Titans
 "Bruce Wayne" (song), a rap song by Takeoff
 Bruce Wayne: Gothom City 1987, an album by Esham

See also

 
 
 Bruce Wayne: Murderer?, 2001 DC Comics comic arc storyline; see List of Batman comics
 Bruce Wayne: Fugitive, 2002 DC Comics comic arc storyline
 Bruce Wayne: The Road Home, 2010 DC Comics arc storyline
 Bruce Wayne Agent of S.H.I.E.L.D., 1996 Amalgam Comics comic arc storyline
 DeWayne Bruce (born 1962), American professional wrestler
 Bruce (disambiguation)
 Wayne (disambiguation)
 Batman (disambiguation)